Thomas Lyon, 8th Earl of Strathmore (1704 – 18 January 1753) was a Scottish nobleman, and Tory politician who sat in the House of Commons from 1734 to 1735, when he resigned upon succeeding to the peerage as Earl of Strathmore.

Lyon was baptized on 6 July 1704, the seventh son of John Lyon, 4th Earl of Strathmore and Kinghorne, and his wife Lady Elizabeth Stanhope daughter of Philip Stanhope, 2nd Earl of Chesterfield.

Lyon was returned as Tory member of parliament (MP) for Forfarshire on the Strathmore interest at the 1734 British general election. He vacated his seat when he succeeded his brother to the peerage on 4 January 1735.
 
On 20 July 1736, Strathmore married Joan (or Jean) Nicholson, daughter of James Nicholson of West Rainton, county Durham at Houghton-le-Spring. He died on 18 January 1753, leaving three sons and four daughters:

John Lyon, who changed his name and became John Bowes, 9th Earl of Strathmore and Kinghorne (1737–1776)
James Philip Lyon (1738–1763)
Thomas Lyon (1741–1796). MP for Aberdeen Burghs. Married Mary Wren. Their daughter Charlotte Lyon (died 1871) married Revd Henry George Liddell (died 1872) (son of Sir Henry Liddell 5th Bart). The children of Charlotte Lyon and Revd Henry George Liddell were the Very Revd Henry George Liddell (d. 1898) and Charles Liddell (d. 1894)  
Mary Lyon (died 1767)
Susan Lyon (died 26 February 1769)
Anne Lyon (22 April 1746 – 1811). In 1768 she married John Simpson (1740–1802), of Bradley Hall, Durham, son of John Simpson, of Bradley Hall. Their daughter Maria Susannah Simpson (1773–1845) married Thomas Liddell, 1st Baron Ravensworth (youngest son of Sir Henry Liddell 5th Bart, younger brother of Revd Henry George Liddell died 1872). Their youngest daughter, Frances Eleanor (1775 or 1776 – 15 April 1833) married in 1799 Sir John Dean Paul, 1st Bart. of Rodborough, Co. of Gloucester, (1775–1852) and had three sons and four daughters. 
Jane Lyon (died 1836)

Ancestry

References 

1704 births
1753 deaths
8
Thomas
Members of the Parliament of Great Britain for Scottish constituencies
British MPs 1734–1741